Rudolph Laver (19 July 1872 in Castlemaine, Victoria – September 1946 in Berlin) was an Australian-German electrical engineer.

Biography

Rudolph Laver was one of seven sons of farmer Jonas Laver (1819-1880) from Somerset and of Mary Ann née Fry (†1885). Rudolph Laver emigrated to Germany in 1899, studied electrical engineering in Karlsruhe and Charlottenburg, and was naturalized in Germany in 1915. Laver was director at the power plant company Bergmann Elektrizitätswerke in Berlin. With the outbreak of World War I, large parts of the Bergmann works were converted to armaments production, and Laver was released from his work.  In 1934 Laver replaced the then managing director Martin Rosenfeld of the Paul Bouveron GmbH.  The name of the company changed to Transformatorenfabrik Rudolph Laver vormals Paul Bouveron GmbH. After his death, the company passed in inheritance to his widow Klara, née Rothweiler.

See also
 His brother Frank Laver

Sources 
 The Cyclopedia of Victoria, Volume 3, 2012, p. 121.

References

1872 births
1946 deaths
German electrical engineers
People from Castlemaine, Victoria
Australian emigrants to Germany